The Bautek Skycruiser is a German ultralight trike, designed and produced by Bautek of Kenn, Germany. The aircraft is supplied as a complete ready-to-fly-aircraft.

Design and development
The Skycruiser was Bautek's first trike design and was designed to comply with the German 120 kg microlight category.  The aircraft features a cable-braced hang glider-style high-wing, weight-shift controls, a single-seat open cockpit, tricycle landing gear with finned wheel pants and a single engine in pusher configuration.

The aircraft is made from bolted-together aluminum tubing, with its double surface wing covered in Dacron sailcloth. Its  span Bautek Pico L wing is supported by a single tube-type kingpost and uses an "A" frame weight-shift control bar. The powerplant is a specially modified and tuned twin cylinder, air-cooled, four-stroke,  Briggs & Stratton Vanguard 1000 engine.

The fuel tank holds  of fuel.

The Skycruiser is German DULV certified.

Specifications (Skycruiser)

References

External links

2000s German sport aircraft
2000s German ultralight aircraft
Single-engined pusher aircraft
Ultralight trikes
Aircraft first flown in 2009